Ananya is an Indian Marathi language film directed by Pratap Phad and produced by Ravi Jadhav and Dhruv Das. The film stars Hruta Durgule, Amey Wagh, Chetan Chitnis, Yogesh Soman. Music by Sameer Saptiskar. The film was released on 22 July 2022.

Synopsis 
When a spirit-crushing mishap disrupts Ananya's perfect life, she cannot seem to stop sulking over her miseries. However, a whole new world of possibilities opens up after she decides to stand on her own two feet.

Cast 
 Hruta Durgule as Ananya Deshmukh 
 Amey Wagh as Jay Dixit 
 Suvrat Joshi as Dhananjay Deshmukh
 Chetan Chitnis as Shekhar Sarpotdar
 Rucha Apte as Priyanka Deshpande 
 Yogesh Soman as Avinash Deshmukh
 Sunil Abhyankar as Nikama Deshpande 
 Renuka Daftardar as Rama Deshpande 
 Shivraj Walvekar as Madhavrao Sarpotdar
 Leena Pandit as Shalini Sarpotdar

Production

Filming
Muhurat shot and formal launch was done on 13 January 2020 in Pune, India. Principal photography began that day, as informed by the makers. On  7 February 2020, entire shooting of the film has been wrapped up.

Soundtrack

Critical response 
Ananya film received positive reviews from critics. A reviewer of The Times of India gave the film 3.5 stars out of 5 and wrote "Hruta Durgule’s performance is praiseworthy. Her portrayal of Ananya’s silent frustration will grip you to your core. Amey Wagh comes in as a chaotic character that induces a bit of levity into the story". Salonee Mistry of Pune Mirror gave the film 3 stars out of 5 and wrote "the film makes you smile, cry and feel proud of Ananya. A film that connects with you this well doesn’t get made every day". Suyog Zore of Cinestaan.com gave the film 3 stars out of 5 and wrote "Overall, Ananya is a well-made drama about the girl's struggle to overcome her physical disability with courage and determination". Reshma Raikwar of Loksatta says "On the strength of good production values, story-direction, good acting, background music, 'Ananya' has been successful in portraying a story of stubborn stubbornness effectively". KalpeshRaj Kubal of Maharashtra Times gave the film 3.5 stars out of 5 and Wrote "A discerning viewer will not fail to feel this 'exclusive general interest'. And for those who just want to be entertained, the movie has drama and comedy". Vinod Ghatge of ABP Majha gave the film 3.5 stars out of 5 and Wrote "There is no doubt that 'Ananya' as a movie will surely give you the experience of watching something nice, positive and cool".

References

External links
 
 

2022 films
2020s Marathi-language films
Indian drama films